Lositsy is a rural locality (a village) in Plyussky District of Pskov Oblast, Russia. Margarita Yamshchikova, an author using an alias of Al. Altayev, owned an estate in the village of Lositsy. The house is currently a museum. The estate is protected as a historical monument of federal significance.

References

Rural localities in Pskov Oblast
Gdovsky Uyezd